Chakki Mod (also called Chakki Morh or Chakki Mor or Chakki Modh) is a village situated in Solan District, Himachal Pradesh. It is 30 km from Chandigarh on Chandigarh-Shimla highway. It is tourist location among youngsters for hangout in natural landscapes and river bed.

See also
 Kasauli
 Dagshai
 Barog

Villages in Solan district